Anomala longilobata is a species of beetle in the family Scarabaeidae. It was described by Ming-Zhi Zhao and Carsten Zorn in 2022.

Etymology 
The species is named after the Latin prefix “longi-” and the adjective “lobatus, -a, -um”, alluding to the slender and lobed lower branch of paramere.

Distribution 
This species can be found in Taiwan.

References 

Rutelinae
Beetles described in 2022